Galloon (sometimes spelled galon in British English) is a heavily-decorated woven or braided trim, typically made of, or featuring, gold or silver thread, which may be woven or embroidered. Galloon trim is used in the trim of military and police uniforms, ecclesiastical dress, and as trim on textiles, drapery, and upholstery. Galloon trim may also come in the form of lace, and is typically wide.

In formal evening wear, a non-military usage, this decoration has evolved into satin stripes that conceal the outer seam of men's dress trousers.

The distinction between galloon trim or braid, ribbon, and belting has not always been clear, and a great deal of overlap has occasionally caused problems in classification.

Etymology
The term galloon stems from the French , in turn itself from the verb , "to braid".

Gallery

References

Further reading
 Abbott, James Archer. Jansen Furniture. Acanathus Press: 2007. .
 Pegler, Martin. The Dictionary of Interior Design. Fairchild Publications: 1983. ASIN B0006ECV48.

Decorative ropework
Braids
Uniforms